The seventh season of the Australian police-drama Blue Heelers premiered on the Seven Network on 9 February 2000 and aired on Wednesday nights at 8:30 pm. The 41-episode season concluded 22 November 2000.

Cast

Main cast 
 Jane Allsop as Constable Jo Parrish
 Rupert Reid as Constable Jack Lawson
 Paul Bishop as Acting Sergeant / Senior Constable Ben Stewart
 Julie Nihill as Chris Riley
 Martin Sacks as Senior Detective P. J. Hasham
 Lisa McCune as Senior Constable Maggie Doyle 
 John Wood as Senior Sergeant Tom Croydon
 Caroline Craig as Sergeant Tess Gallagher

Recurring cast 
 Dennis Miller as Pat Doyle
 Terry Serio as Mick Doyle
 Mark Wilson as Benny Matthews
 Marcus Eyre as Detective Paul Donald
 Adam Palmer as Detective Doug Turnbull
 Neil Pigot as Inspector Russell Falcon-Price
 Peta Doodson as Inspector Monica Draper
 Suzi Dougherty as Dr. Mel Carter

Guest cast 
Notable guest actors for this season included Paul Dawber, Alan Hopgood, Olivia Hamnett, Kate Hood, Ian Rawlings, Andy Anderson, Dennis Coard, Roger Oakley, Betty Lucas, James Condon, Alex Papps, Mary Ward, Tommy Dysart, Maggie Kirkpatrick, Joy Westmore, Alyce Platt, Jeremy Angerson, Sean Scully, Zoe Bertram, Wendy Strehlow and Nicki Paull.

Plot

Maggie, aided by PJ and her brother Mick, arrived at the point of cracking the drug ring she had been pursuing for a year and realised that she would have to go into witness protection. To do so, she staged a breakup with PJ and then awaited her escort nervously. PJ, however, realised that she was being tricked and arrived just seconds too late, to see Maggie shot down by a mysterious assailant. The episodes that followed, the "Who Killed Maggie Doyle?" arc, were the most-watched episodes ever. Arrested for Maggie's murder, PJ looked desperately to prove that he was being framed. Ultimately, in episode 263 "Out of the Shadows", he discovered the truth - it was her brother Mick.

Reception

This season marked the start of the show's downfall in the public consciousness.

Awards

Episodes

DVD release 
Due to contractual negotiations, the release of this season, as well as any proceeding seasons, was postponed. These negotiations have concluded and the "Complete Seventh Season" DVD set (parts one and two) was released for sale in Australia (Region 4) on 31 July 2008. The seventh season was released, as its predecessors were, in two parts. However, this season was simply released in a standard DVD package, not a boxed set with slipcase packaging like its predecessors. It is expected to be released as a complete package sometime in the future.

Notes

References

General
 Zuk, T. Blue Heelers: 2000 episode guide, Australian Television Information Archive. Retrieved 1 August 2007.
 TV.com editors. Blue Heelers Episode Guide - Season 7, TV.com. Retrieved 1 August 2007.
Specific

Blue Heelers seasons
2000 Australian television seasons